The following is a sortable list of compositions by Rebecca Clarke, drawn largely from the lists found on the website of the Rebecca Clarke Society. The works are categorized and sortable by genre, date of composition, and title.

References

Clarke, Rebecca